Qutayla, also transliterated Ḳutaila and Ḳutayla, is an Arabic name. People bearing this name include:

 Qutayla ukht al-Nadr, seventh-century CE poet
 Qutaylah bint Abd-al-Uzza